Fiat is a ghost town in Paw Paw Township, Elk County, Kansas, United States.

History
A post office was opened in Fiat in 1882, and remained in operation until it was discontinued in 1898.

References

Further reading

External links
 Elk County maps: Current, Historic, KDOT

Unincorporated communities in Elk County, Kansas
Unincorporated communities in Kansas